Pablo Andújar tried to defend his 2008 title; however, he was eliminated by Pedro Clar-Rosselló in the quarterfinal.
Thiemo de Bakker defeated Filip Krajinović 6–2, 6–3 in the final.

Seeds

Draw

Final four

Top half

Bottom half

References
 Main draw
 Qualifying draw

Singles